Aspergillus polyporicola is a species of fungus in the genus Aspergillus. It is from the Flavipedes section. The species was first described in 2015.

Growth and morphology

A. polyporicola has been cultivated on both Czapek yeast extract agar (CYA) plates and Malt Extract Agar Oxoid® (MEAOX) plates. The growth morphology of the colonies can be seen in the pictures below.

References 

polyporicola
Fungi described in 2015